The Plaza de Toros de El Bibio is a bullring located in Gijón, Asturias, Spain.

Situated in the neighbourhood of El Bibio, it was inaugurated on August 12, 1888, with a bullfighting with Luis Mazzantini and Rafael Guerra, Guerrita.

The bullring was partially destroyed between July and August 1936, in the context of Spanish Civil War. In August 1937, after the city was taken by the Nationalist faction, Francoist troops used its ruins as a temporary concentration camp for Republican prisoners.

It was renovated in 1997. On March 20, 1992, it was declared Bien de Interés Cultural.

Apart from bullfighting, the ring is also used for music concerts.

References

External links 
Profile at Mundotoro
Profile at Tauroweb

Bullrings in Spain
Francoist concentration camps
Sports venues in Asturias
Sports venues completed in 1888
Neo-Mudéjar architecture in Spain
Bien de Interés Cultural landmarks in Asturias